Environmental Communication is a peer-reviewed scientific journal covering environmental communication. It was established in May 2007, with Steve Depoe (University of Cincinnati) as founding editor, and is published eight times per year by Routledge. It is the official journal of the International Environmental Communication Association. The editor-in-chief is Shirley Ho (Nanyang Technological University). According to the Taylor & Francis Journal Metrics, the journal has a 2021 impact factor of  3.518.

References

External links

Environmental communication
Environmental social science journals
Routledge academic journals
English-language journals
Publications established in 2007